Ajay Bhushan Pandey (born 2 February 1961; IAST: Ajaya Bhūṣaṇa Pāṇḍeya) is a 1984 batch Indian Administrative Service (IAS) officer belonging to the Maharashtra cadre. He is former  Finance Secretary  of India. He is also  former chief executive officer (CEO) of the Unique Identification Authority of India (UIDAI), the nodal agency of Government of India responsible for implementing Aadhaar. He  also worked  as the  chairman of Goods and Services Tax Network from September 2017 to March 2021

Education 
Pandey  gained a Bachelor of Technology degree in Electrical from the Indian Institute of Technology Kanpur (IIT Kanpur). He earned a Master of Science degree and a Doctor of Philosophy degree in computer science from the University of Minnesota under Jaideep Srivastava.

Career 
Pandey has served as Principal Secretary (Information Technology), the managing director of Maharashtra State Electricity Distribution Corporation, secretary to the Chief Minister of Maharashtra, Deputy Commissioner (Sales Tax) and as the district magistrate and collector of a district in the Maharashtra government; and as the chairperson of the Goods and Services Tax Network, director general and mission director in UIDAI, deputy director general in UIDAI, and as a deputy secretary in the Ministry of Labour and Employment in the Indian government.

Chief Executive Officer of the Unique Identification Authority of India 
Pandey was appointed as the chief executive officer (CEO) of the Unique Identification Authority of India by the prime minister-headed Appointments Committee of the Cabinet (ACC) in May 2016, he assumed office on 31 May 2016.

In June 2017, after Pandey's promotion, the status of CEO of UIDAI was upgraded to be equivalent to a secretary to the Government of India from additional secretary to the Government of India.

Chairperson of the Goods and Service Tax Network 
Pandey was given the additional charge of chairperson of the Goods and Services Tax Network by the ACC in September 2017. He assumed office on 10 September 2017.

References

External links 
 Executive record sheet as maintained by the Department of Personnel and Training of the Ministry of Personnel, Public Grievances and Pensions of the Government of India
 Executive profile at Bloomberg

Indian Administrative Service officers
IIT Kanpur alumni
University of Minnesota alumni
People from Bihar
1962 births
Living people